The Kinleith Branch railway line is located in the Waikato region of New Zealand. The line was constructed by the Thames Valley and Rotorua Railway Company, Taupo Totara Timber Company and rebuilt by the Public Works Department primarily to serve the Kinleith Mill in 1952.

History
The New Zealand Government Railways line to Thames was opened to Morrinsville on 1 October 1884. Taking advantage of enabling legislation, the Thames Valley and Rotorua Railway Company originally built the line from Morrinsville as part of its planned route to Rotorua as far as Lichfield. The Morrinsville-Oxford section opened without any ceremony on 8 March 1886. NZGR took over the company on 8 March 1886, instead building the Rotorua Branch railway line from Putāruru. The  section between Putāruru and Lichfield was closed by NZGR in 1897 as it served no purpose. The Taupo Totara Timber Company (TTT Company) then used the disused railway formation from Putāruru for its lightly constructed bush tramway line to Mokai, near Lake Taupō.

Following the exhaustion of native timber in the region, the TTT Company line closed on 26 October 1944. The government saw that the line had greater potential and in September 1946 acquired the  section between Putāruru and Kinleith. This line formed part of a proposed railway line to Taupō. The section of line reopened on 9 June 1947 under the control of the Public Works Department, using geared steam locomotives purchased from the TTT Co. The Public Works Department eventually rebuilt the line with heavier rail, some of it brought from Taranaki after opening of the Turakina deviation, wider curves and slighter grades, reaching Tokoroa in 1949 and Kinleith in 1952.

Bridges 
There were 14 bridges on the original Morrinsville to Oxford section.

Services

From 1913 the Morrinsville to Putāruru service was operated by a motor train.

Since the withdrawal of the Geyserland Express to Rotorua in 2001, all services on the line are freight trains. The line from Putāruru - Kinleith Mill has only seen regular freight trains since being rebuilt in 1952. Occasional excursion passenger trains have operated, some being hauled by preserved steam locomotives.

The branch sees eight trains in and out of Kinleith each weekday, two on Saturdays and four on Sundays. Tokoroa Road Rail Terminal opened in 2015 and handled an average of about 11 containers a day in its first 6 months.

References

Bibliography

External links 
 1886 Lichfield-Auckland timetable
 Ministry of Works progress report 1950 (page 15)
 Morrinsville Museum photos of station and bridges

Railway lines in New Zealand
Rail transport in Waikato
3 ft 6 in gauge railways in New Zealand
Railway lines opened in 1952